The Allison V-1710 aircraft engine designed and produced by the Allison Engine Company was the only US-developed V-12 liquid-cooled engine to see service during World War II. Versions with a turbocharger gave excellent performance at high altitude in the twin-engined Lockheed P-38 Lightning, and turbo-superchargers were fitted to experimental single-engined fighters with similar results.

The United States Army Air Corps (USAAC) preference for turbochargers early in the V-1710's development program meant that less effort was spent on developing suitable mechanically driven centrifugal superchargers for the Allison V-12 design, as other V-12 designs from friendly nations like the British  Rolls-Royce Merlin were already using.

When smaller-dimensioned or lower-cost versions of the V-1710 were desired, they generally had poor performance at higher altitudes. The V-1710 nevertheless gave excellent service when turbocharged, notably in the P-38 Lightning, which accounted for much of the extensive production run.

Design and development

The Allison Division of General Motors began developing an ethylene glycol-cooled engine in 1929 to meet a USAAC need for a modern, engine to fit into a new generation of streamlined bombers and fighters. To ease production, the new design could be equipped with different propeller gearing systems and superchargers, allowing a single production line to build engines for various fighters and bombers.

The United States Navy (USN) hoped to use the V-1710 in its rigid airships Akron and Macon, but both were equipped with German-built Maybach VL-2 engines as the V-1710 was still in testing when the Macon was lost in February 1935 (the Akron having been lost in April 1933). The USAAC purchased its first V-1710 in December 1932. The Great Depression slowed development, and it was not until December 14, 1936, that the engine next flew in the Consolidated XA-11A testbed. The engine was then offered to aircraft manufacturers where it powered the prototype Curtiss XP-37s. All entrants in the new pursuit competition were designed around it, powering the Lockheed P-38, Bell P-39 and Curtiss P-40. When war material procurement agents from the United Kingdom asked North American Aviation to build the P-40 under license, NAA instead proposed their own improved aircraft design, using the V-1710 in their NA-73.

Technical description
The valvetrain has a single overhead camshaft per bank of cylinders and four valves per cylinder.

Versatility and reversibility of rotation
The engine design benefited from the General Motors philosophy of built-in production and installation versatility, embracing a philosophy of modular design for aviation powerplants. The engine was constructed around a basic power section, from which different installation requirements could be met by fitting the appropriate accessories section at the rear, and an appropriate power output drive at the front. A turbo-supercharger could be used, if desired.

The P-39, P-63, and Douglas XB-42 Mixmaster used V-1710-Es, exchanging the integral reduction gear for an extension shaft driving a remotely located reduction gear and propeller. Aircraft such as the P-38, P-40, P-51A, and North American P-82E used close-coupled propeller reduction gears, a feature of the V-1710-F series.

The accessory end had a one- or two-speed engine-driven supercharger that might have a second stage with or without an intercooler, the ignition magnetos and the customary assortment of oil and fuel pumps, all dictated by the application requirements. The front of the engine could have one of a number of different output drives. The drive might be a "long-nose" or close coupled propeller reduction gear, an extension drive to a remote gearbox, or a gearbox that could drive two wing-mounted propellers from a fuselage-mounted engine. Another key feature of the V-1710 design was its ability to turn the output shaft clockwise or counter-clockwise by assembling the engine with the crankshaft turned end-for-end, by installing an idler gear in the drive train to the supercharger, camshafts, and accessories, installing a starter turning the proper direction, and re-arranging the ignition wiring on the right side to accommodate a changed firing order. No change to the oil pump nor coolant pump circuits was needed. The ability to reverse the direction of rotation with a minimum of extra parts to achieve the task allowed the use of either a "tractor" or "pusher" propeller. This approach allowed easy changes of the supercharger(s) and supercharger drive-gear ratio.

Supercharger

The V-1710 has often been criticized for not having a "high-altitude" supercharger. The comparison is usually to the later, two-stage, versions of the Rolls-Royce Merlin 60-series engines also built by Packard as the V-1650 and used in the P-51B Mustang and subsequent variants. The USAAC had specified that the V-1710 was to be a single-stage supercharged engine and, if a higher altitude capability was desired, the aircraft could use their newly developed turbo-supercharger as was featured in the XP-37(YP-37), P-38, and XP-39.

The benefits of a two-stage supercharger eventually became so clear that Allison did make some efforts in this direction. Allison attached an auxiliary supercharger in various configurations to the existing engine-mounted supercharger and carburetor. Early versions of these two-stage supercharger engines were used on the P-63. No intercooler, aftercooler, or backfire screen (flame trap) were incorporated into these two-stage V-1710 engines (except for the V-1710-119 used on the experimental P-51J, which had an aftercooler). The two-stage Merlin engines had all of these features, which were designed to prevent detonation from charge heating and backfire into the supercharger. The G-series V-1710s installed on the F-82 E/F/G models had only anti-detonation injection (ADI) to deal with these problems, and not surprisingly had severe reliability and maintenance problems. In one record, it was stated that the F-82 required 33 hours of maintenance for each hour of flight.

Although the early V-1710 powered P-39, P-40 and P-51A were limited to combat operations at a maximum of about  they were available in comparatively large numbers and were the mainstay of some Allied Air Forces in all but the European theater of war. The engines proved to be robust and little affected by machine-gun fire. In total, over 60 percent of the post-June 1941 USAAF's pursuit aircraft operated during WWII were powered by the V-1710.

Allison slowly but continuously improved the engine during the war.

The end of the war ended this development, so this promising experiment never flew. The extra power of this version was derived from using exhaust turbines, not to drive a turbo-supercharger, but to return that energy to turning the crankshaft, called a turbo-compound engine.

Improvements in manufacturing brought the cost to produce each engine from $25,000 down to $8,500 and allowed the installed lifetime of the engine to be increased from 300 hours to as much as 1,000 hours for the less-stressed power-plants. Weight increases needed to accomplish this were minimal, with the result that all models were able to produce more than 1 hp/lb (1.6 kW/kg) at their takeoff rating.

Comparisons between the Allison V-1710 and the Rolls-Royce Merlin engine "families" are inevitable. What can be said for the Allison is that it made more power at less boost, with a longer time between overhauls, and with a parts-count that was nearly half that of the Merlin engine, which greatly facilitated mass production. There was also a high degree of commonality of parts throughout the series. The individual parts of the Allison series were produced to a high degree of standardization and reliability, using the best technology available at the time. Even after the war, racing Merlins used Allison connecting rods. As stated previously, General Motors' policies regarding versatility meant that their Allison division would also employ modular design features on the V-1710 from its "long block" core V-12 unit outwards, so that it was capable of being mated to many different styles of turbo-superchargers and various other accessories, although the variety of turbo-superchargers available for installation was limited due to the constraints of single-engine fighter design. Since it was produced in large numbers and was highly standardised, the engine has been used in many postwar racing designs. Its reliability and well-mannered operation allowed it to operate at high rpm for extended periods.

Following the war, North American built 250 P-82E/F for air defense roles into the early 1950s. This was the final military role for the V-1710.

Turbo-supercharger
The USAAC had earlier decided to concentrate on turbo-superchargers for high altitude boost, believing that further development of turbo-superchargers would allow their engines to outperform European rivals using displacement superchargers. Turbo-superchargers are powered by the engine exhaust and so do not draw much power from the engine crankshaft, whereas displacement superchargers are coupled directly by shafts and gears to the engine crankshaft. Turbo-superchargers do increase the exhaust back-pressure and thus do cause a very small decrease in engine power, but the power increase due to increased induction pressures more than makes up for that decrease. General Electric was the sole source for research and production of American turbo-superchargers during this period, from its four decades worth of steam turbine engineering experience.

Turbo-superchargers were highly successful in U.S. bombers, which were exclusively powered by radial engines. The P-47 fighter had the same combination of radial engine (R-2800) and turbo-supercharger and was also successful, apart from its large bulk, which was caused by the need for the ductwork for the aft-mounted turbo-supercharger.

However, mating the turbocharger with the Allison V-1710 proved to be problematic. As a result, designers of the fighter planes that used the V-1710 were invariably forced to choose between the poor high-altitude performance of the V-1710 versus the increased problems brought on by addition of the turbo-supercharger. The fates of all of the V-1710 powered fighters of World War II would thus hinge on that choice.

The original XP-39 was built with a V-1710 augmented by a General Electric Type B-5 turbo-supercharger as specified by Fighter Projects Officer Lieutenant Benjamin S. Kelsey and his colleague Gordon P. Saville. Numerous changes were made to the design during a period of time when Kelsey's attention was focused elsewhere, and Bell engineers, NACA aero-dynamic specialists and the substitute fighter project officer determined that dropping the turbocharger would be among the drag reduction measures indicated by borderline wind tunnel test results; an unnecessary step, according to aviation engineer and historian Warren M. Bodie. The production P-39 was thus stuck with poor high-altitude performance and proved unsuitable for the air war in Western Europe which was largely conducted at high altitudes. The P-39 was rejected by the British, but used by the U.S. in the Mediterranean and the early Pacific air war, as well as shipped to the Soviet Union in large numbers under the Lend Lease program. The Soviets were able to make good use of P-39s because of its excellent manoeuvrability and because the air war on the Eastern Front in Europe was primarily short ranged, tactical, and conducted at lower altitudes. In the P-39, Soviet pilots scored the highest number of individual kills made on any American, or British fighter type.  The P-40, which also had only the single-stage, single-speed-supercharged V-1710, had similar problems with high-altitude performance.

The P-38 was the only fighter to make it into combat during World War II with turbo-supercharged V-1710s. The operating conditions of the Western European air war – flying for long hours in intensely cold weather at  – revealed several problems with these engines. They had a poor manifold fuel-air distribution and poor temperature regulation of the turbo-supercharger air, which resulted in frequent engine failures (detonation occurred as the result of persistent uneven fuel-air mixture across the cylinders caused by the poor manifold design). Specially formulated fuels were a necessity for the P-38 as were specific spark plugs needed for specific cylinders. The turbo-supercharger had additional problems with getting stuck in the freezing air in either high or low boost mode; the high boost mode could cause detonation in the engine, while the low boost mode would be manifested as power loss in one engine, resulting in sudden fishtailing in flight. These problems were aggravated by sub-optimal engine management techniques taught to many pilots during the first part of WWII, including a cruise setting that ran the engine at high RPM and low manifold pressure with a rich mixture. These settings can contribute to over-cooling of the engine, fuel condensation problems, accelerated mechanical wear, and the likelihood of components binding or "freezing up." Details of the failure patterns were described in a report by General Doolittle to General Spatz in January 1944. In March 1944, the first Allison engines appearing over Berlin belonged to a group of P-38Hs of 55th Fighter Group, engine troubles contributing to a reduction of the force to half strength over the target. It was too late to correct these problems in the production lines of Allison or GE, and as the numbers of Merlin-engined P-51 Mustangs based in England mounted up through the end of 1943 and into 1944, the P-38s were steadily withdrawn from Europe until October 1944 when they were no longer used for bomber escort duty with the Eighth Air Force. A few P-38s would remain in the European theater as the F-5 for photo reconnaissance.

The P-38 had fewer engine failures in the Pacific Theater, where operating techniques were better developed (such as those recommended by Charles Lindbergh during his development work in the theater),) and the Japanese did not operate at such high altitudes. Using the same P-38Gs which were proving difficult to maintain in England, Pacific-based pilots were able to use the aircraft to good advantage including, in April 1943, Operation Vengeance, the interception and downing of the Japanese bomber carrying Admiral Isoroku Yamamoto. New P-38 models with ever-increasing power from more advanced Allisons were eagerly accepted by Pacific air groups.

When Packard started building Merlin V-1650 engines in America in 1942, certain American fighter designs using the Allison V-1710 were changed to use the Merlin. The P-40F, a Lend Lease export to Britain, was one of the first American fighters to be converted to a Packard-Merlin engine. However, the installed engine was the V-1650-1 (a Packard-produced Merlin XX) with a slightly improved single-stage, two-speed supercharger, yielding only modest gains over the Allison V-1710.

The last Allison powered P-51, the Mustang I(II)/P-51A, used the single-stage, single-speed Allison V-1710-81, with a 9.6:1 blower ratio. Its speed impressed the British, and the RAF quickly realized the airplane would possess excellent high altitude performance if the Allison V-1710 engine were replaced by the 60-Series Merlin. A similar proposal to cure the P-38's problems by replacing its Allisons with Merlins was quashed by the USAAF, after protests from Allison.  

Starting with the V-1710-45 around 1943 (after the P-51 had been fitted with a Merlin 61 by Rolls-Royce), Allison attached an auxiliary supercharger to some of its engines in an effort to improve high-altitude performance. The two-stage supercharged Allison was essentially developed as an "add on" to the single-stage engine, and required minimal changes to the base engine. While it lacked the refinement, compactness and after-cooler of the two-stage Merlin, the Allison used a pressure-altitude governed variable-speed first stage. Various configurations of this auxiliary supercharger were used in production versions of the V-1710 that powered aircraft such as the Bell P-63 and North American P-82E/F/G series. In addition, it was tried or studied as the powerplant for many experimental and test aircraft such as the Curtiss XP-55 Ascender, North American XP-51J "lightweight Mustang", Boeing XB-38 Flying Fortress, and Republic XP-47A (AP-10), both of the latter with turbo-superchargers.

Post-war

The V-1710-powered F-82 did not arrive in time for World War II, but did see brief action in the Korean War, although the type was completely withdrawn from Korea by the end of 1950. It had a short service life that was probably due to a combination of factors: poor reliability from the G-series V-1710 engines, low numbers of F-82s produced, and the arrival of jet fighters. The initial production P-82B had Merlin engines, but North American was forced to use the Allison V-1710 for the E/F/G models when Packard stopped production of the Merlin engine.

In total, 69,305 V-1710s were built by Allison during the war, all in Indianapolis, Indiana.

Other uses
The V-1710's useful life continued, as thousands were available on the surplus market. In the 1950s, many drag racers and land speed racers, attracted by its reliability and good power output, adopted the V-1710; Art Arfons and brother Walt in particular used one, in Green Monster. It proved unsuccessful as a drag racing engine, being unable to accelerate rapidly, but "could taxi all day at 150". Unlimited hydroplane racing also became a big sport across the U.S. at this time and V-1710s were often tuned for racing at up to —power levels that were beyond design criteria and significantly reduced durability.

Later, as purpose-built V8 engines became available for drag racing and unlimited boats shifted to turboshaft power, tractor pullers began using the Allison engine, again developing unimagined power. Finally, the warbird movement began to restore and return to the air examples of the classic fighters of the war and many V-1710-powered pursuit airplanes began to fly again, with freshly overhauled engines. The reliability, maintainability, and availability of the engine has led others to use it to power flying examples of aircraft whose original engines are unobtainable. This includes newly manufactured Russian Yak-3 and Yak-9 airplanes, originally powered by Klimov V-12s in World War II and the two (so far) airworthy examples of the Ilyushin Il-2, taking the place of the Mikulin V-12 it originally used, as well as ambitious projects such as a replica Douglas World Cruiser and Focke-Wulf Fw 190D by Flug Werk of Germany.

Variants

Allison's internal model designation for the V-1710 started with the letter A and proceeded to the letter H.  Each letter designated a family of engines that shared major components, but differed in specific design details.  Each of these designs were identified by a number, starting with number 1.  The last letter, which was introduced when both right hand turning and left hand turning engines were built, identified by the letter R or L respectively.

The military model numbers were identified by a "dash number" following the engine description "V-1710". The USAAC/USAAF models were the odd numbers, starting with "-1" and the USN models were the even numbers, starting with "-2".

"A" series engines were early development engines for the USN and USAAC.  The first military model was a single V-1710-2, which was first sold to the USN on June 26, 1930. The "A" engines had no counterweights on the crankshaft, 5.75:1 compression ratio, 2:1 internal spur gear-type reduction gear boxes, 8.77:1 supercharger ratio,  impeller, SAE #50 propeller shaft, a float-type carburetor, and produced  at 2800 rpm on 92 octane gasoline.

"B" series engines were designed for USN airships. The military model was V-1710-4. They differed from the "A" series engines in that they did not have a supercharger, had two float-type down-draft carburetors were mounted directly to the intake manifold, an SAE #40 propeller shaft, and could be brought from full power to stop and back to full power in the opposite rotation in less than 8 seconds.  They produced  at 2400 rpm.

"C" series engines were developed for highly streamlined pursuit aircraft for the USAAC, and are easily identified by the long reduction gear case. These engines came in two groups, one group rated at full power at sea level, the other rated at full power at high altitude. The altitude rating difference was in the supercharger gear ratio, four of which were used: 6.23:1, 6.75:1, 8.0:1  and 8.77:1. These engines received heavier crankcases, a stronger crankshaft,  SAE #50 propeller shaft, and Bendix pressure carburetors.

"D" series engines were designed for pusher applications using propeller-speed extension shafts and remote thrust bearings mounted to the airframe. The military models were V-1710-9, -13, -23,  and  -41, producing  at 2600 rpm. Supercharger ratios were 6.23:1, 8.0:1 or 8.77:1, depending on altitude rating. These engines had the compression ratio increased to 6.65:1. Marvel MC-12 fuel injection, which was unsatisfactory and quickly replaced by a float-type carburetor on -9 and -13 models.  Later dash number engines used Bendix pressure carburetors.  These engines were being designed at the same time as the V-3420 engine, and shared many assemblies as they were developed.  The "D" series engines were the last of the "early" V-1710 engines.

"E" series engines were designed for remote gearbox applications using crankshaft-speed extension shafts and remote 1.8:1 gearboxes with SAE #60 hollow propeller shafts. The military models were V-1710-6, -17, -31, 35, -37, -47, -59, -63, -83, -85, -93, -103, -109, -117, -125, -127, -129, -133,-135 and -137, producing  at 3000 rpm. Supercharger gear ratios were: 6.44:1, 7.48:1, 8.10:1, 8.80:1 and 9.6:1 depending on altitude rating.  These engines were a complete redesign, and did not share many components with the earlier engine series. Almost all components were interchangeable with later series engines and the V-3420, and could be assembled as right hand or left hand turning engines in either pusher or tractor applications.

"F" series engines were designed for late model pursuit aircraft, and are identified by the compact external spur gear-type reduction gear box. Military models were V-1710-27, -29, -39, -45, -49, -51, -53, -55, -57, -61, -75, -77, -81, -87, -89, -91, -95, -99, -101, -105, -107, -111, -113, -115, -119, producing  at 3000 rpm. The V-1710-101, -119 and -121 models has an auxiliary supercharger, some with a liquid-cooled aftercooler. Supercharger gear ratios were: 6.44:1, 7.48:1, 8.10:1, 8.80:1 and 9.60:1 depending on altitude rating. These engines had either a six or twelve weight crankshaft, revised vibration dampeners that combined to allow higher engine speeds,  SAE #50 propeller shaft, and higher horsepower ratings.  The "E" series and "F" series engines were very similar, the primary difference being the front crankcase cover, which was interchangeable between the two series engines.

"G" series engines were designed for high-altitude pursuit aircraft, and are identified by the auxiliary supercharger with a Bendix "Speed-Density" fuel control. Military models were V-1710-97, -131, -143, -145, and -147, producing  at 3000 rpm. Supercharger gear ratios were: 7.48:1, 7.76:1,  8.10:1, 8.80:1 and 9.60:1 depending on altitude rating. These engines were equipped with an SAE #50 propeller shaft and a single power lever to regulate engine performance, reducing the pilot's workload when managing this very complex engine.

"H" series engines were to use a two-stage supercharger driven by a two-stage air-cooled power recovery turbine. The engine was to have an aftercooler and port-type fuel injection.  This variant, however, was never built.

Applications
 Bell FM-1 Airacuda
 Bell FL Airabonita
 Bell P-39 Airacobra
 Bell P-63 Kingcobra
 Boeing XB-38 Flying Fortress
 Curtiss P-40 Warhawk
 Curtiss-Wright XP-55 Ascender
 Curtiss XP-60A
Curtiss P-37
 Douglas XB-42 Mixmaster
 Douglas DC-8
 Lockheed P-38 Lightning
 North American A-36 Apache
 North American F-82 Twin Mustang
 North American P-51 Mustang
 T29 Heavy Tank (trial)

Engines on display
An Allison V-1710-51 is on public display at the Aerospace Museum of California

Specifications (V-1710-F30R / -111)

See also

References

Notes

Bibliography
Bodie, Warren M. The Lockheed P-38 Lightning: The Definitive Story of Lockheed's P-38 Fighter. Hayesville, North Carolina: Widewing Publications, 2001, 1991. 
Jane's Fighting Aircraft of World War II. London. Studio Editions, 1998. 
Kirkland, Richard. War Pilot: True Tales of Combat and Adventure. New York: Ballantine Books, 2003. 
Ludwig, Paul. P-51 Mustang – Development of the Long Range Escort Fighter. Walton-on-Thames, Surrey, UK: Classic Publications, 2003. 
Smith, Richard K. The Airships Akron & Macon, Flying Aircraft Carriers of The United States Navy. Annapolis, Maryland: United States Naval Institute, 1965.
White, Graham. Allied Aircraft Piston Engines of World War II: History and Development of Frontline Aircraft Piston Engines Produced By Great Britain and the United States during World War II. Warrendale, Pennsylvania: Society of Automotive Engineers, 1995. 
Whitney, Daniel. Vee's for Victory!: The Story of the Allison V-1710 Aircraft Engine 1929–1948. Atglen, Pennsylvania: Schiffer Publishing, 1998.

External links

Popular Science, October 1940, Streamline Motors For Streamline Airplanes
THE LIQUID-COOLED ALLISON Flight 1941
The Allison V-1710 Turbo-Compound
"America's Allison Engine" a 1942 Flight article

V-1710
1930s aircraft piston engines
V12 aircraft engines